The McCoy Brook Formation is a geological formation dating to roughly between 200 and 190 million years ago and covering the Hettangian to Sinemurian stages.  The McCoy Brook Formation is found in outcrops around the Bay of Fundy, Nova Scotia.

Agen
The McCoy Brook Formation rests on the North Mountain Basalt, one of the volcanic flows associated with the Triassic–Jurassic boundary in the Newark Supergroup. The base of the McCoy Brook Formation is probably within 100,000 to 200,000 years of the boundary.

Scots Bay Member 
This thin unit (9 m) of lacustrine sediments is preserved in six small synclinal outcrops around Scots Bay on the west side of the Blomidon Peninsula. Originally named as the Scots Bay Formation, it is now correlated with the lowermost part of the McCoy Brook Formation, where it is referred to as the Scots Bay Member.

Fossil content

Sharks

Ray-finned fish

Synapsids

Sphenodonts

Crocodyliforms

Dinosaurs

Ornithischia

Sauropodomorpha

Ichnotaxa

See also 
 List of dinosaur-bearing rock formations
 List of stratigraphic units with few dinosaur genera

References 

Geologic formations of Canada
Jurassic System of North America
Hettangian Stage
Sandstone formations of Canada
Alluvial deposits
Aeolian deposits
Fluvial deposits
Lacustrine deposits
Ichnofossiliferous formations
Geology of Nova Scotia